The 1969–70 Bulgarian Hockey League season was the 18th season of the Bulgarian Hockey League, the top level of ice hockey in Bulgaria. Six teams participated in the league, and Krakra Pernik won the championship.

Standings

External links
 Season on hockeyarchives.info

Bulgar
Bulgarian Hockey League seasons
Bulg